"In My Bed" is a song by English singer and songwriter Amy Winehouse from her debut studio album Frank (2003). It was released on 5 April 2004 as the album's third single (double A-sided with "You Sent Me Flying"), reaching number 60 on the UK Singles Chart.

"In My Bed" samples the beat of the Incredible Bongo Band's 1973 cover of "Apache". Both "In My Bed" and "Made You Look" were produced by Salaam Remi.

A rare live session of Winehouse performing "In My Bed" in 2003 was included in the documentary film Amy (2015), which depicts the singer's life and death.

Music video
The music video for "In My Bed", directed by Paul Gore, begins with Winehouse in a hotel saying goodnight to a young man, presumably her boyfriend, leaving him to his room. Upon their parting, Winehouse begins the song as she walks through the hotel. She is then seen in the hotel ballroom for a short segment performing the chorus of the song onstage with a backing band. Winehouse goes upstairs to her own room while carrying a guitar case. Upon entering her room, she takes a seat on her bed and waits as an unidentified man enters the room and they embrace. The video ends with Winehouse covering the camera with her hand as she prepares to commit infidelity.

Track listings
UK CD single
"In My Bed" (Radio Edit) – 4:05
"You Sent Me Flying" – 3:52
"Best Friend" (Acoustic) – 3:28

UK 12-inch single
A1. "In My Bed" (Bugz in the Attic Vocal Mix)
A2. "You Sent Me Flying"
B1. "In My Bed" (Bass Gangsta)
B2. "In My Bed" (Radio Edit)

Credits and personnel
Credits adapted from the liner notes of Frank.

 Amy Winehouse – vocals, guitar
 21st Century Jazz – accompaniment
 Salaam Remi – production, arrangement, electric bass, drums
 Gary "Mon" Noble – recording, mixing
 Steve "Esp" Nowa – engineering assistance
 Vincent Henry – baritone saxophone, tenor saxophone, alto saxophone, flutes
 John Adams – organ, Rhodes
 Bruce Purse – trumpet, bass trumpet, flugelhorn
 Jeni Fujita – background vocals
 Tom Coyne – mastering

Charts

References

2003 songs
2004 singles
Amy Winehouse songs
Island Records singles
Song recordings produced by Salaam Remi
Songs about casual sex
Songs written by Amy Winehouse
Songs written by Salaam Remi